Avril Doyle (born 18 April 1949) is a former Irish Fine Gael politician who served as a Minister of State from 1986 to 1987 and from 1995 to 1997. She served as a Member of the European Parliament (MEP) from 1999 to 2004 and 2004 to 2009, a Teachta Dála (TD) for the Wexford constituency from 1982 to 1989 and 1992 to 1997 and a Senator for the Agricultural Panel from 1989 to 1992 and 1997 to 2002.

Early life
Doyle was born in Dublin in 1949; she was educated at Holy Child Killiney secondary school and at University College Dublin (UCD). Her father Richard Belton was a Senator and her grandfather Patrick Belton was a TD. She was born on the day The Republic of Ireland Act 1948 came into effect – which saw the inauguration of Ireland as a republic outside the British Commonwealth.

Political career
In 1974, aged 25, she was elected to Wexford County Council and to Wexford Corporation; she was Mayor of Wexford town from 1975 to 1976. She was first elected to Dáil Éireann at the November 1982 general election as a Fine Gael TD for the Wexford constituency. In February 1986, she was appointed on the nomination of Garret FitzGerald as Minister of State at the Department of Finance with special responsibility for the Office of Public Works, and at the Department of the Environment with special responsibility for Environmental Protection.

She lost her seat at the 1989 general election, serving as a member of Seanad Éireann from 1989 to 1992. She was re-elected to the Dáil at the 1992 general election. In January 1995, she was appointed on the nomination of John Bruton as Minister of State at the Department of the Taoiseach, at the Department of Finance and at the Department of Transport, Energy and Communications with responsibility for consumers of public services. At the 1997 general election, she lost to party colleague Michael D'Arcy, and was again elected to the Seanad, serving from 1997 to 2002.

She was elected as an MEP at the 1999 election and re-elected at the 2004 election.

Doyle made news during a debate in the European Parliament in June 2008 after the rejection of the Treaty of Lisbon by Irish voters. A group of British Eurosceptic MEPs wore green hats and T-shirts, encouraging the EU to respect the Irish 'no' vote. However, many Irish MEPs saw this as self-serving and felt that there would be no Eurosceptic support for Irish opinion had the treaty been accepted; and Doyle was both lauded and criticised for the following comment, which is a reference to the forceful occupation of Ireland by Britain; "How the history books could have been written differently, if respect for the Irish vote from some of our British colleagues was always there."

On 7 January 2009, she announced that she would not seek re-election to the European Parliament at the 2009 election.

On 21 June 2011, she announced her intention to seek the Fine Gael party nomination for the 2011 presidential election. She withdrew from the nomination process in October 2011.

See also
Families in the Oireachtas

References

External links

 

1949 births
Living people
Alumni of University College Dublin
Fine Gael MEPs
Fine Gael TDs
Fine Gael senators
Local councillors in County Wexford
MEPs for the Republic of Ireland 1999–2004
MEPs for the Republic of Ireland 2004–2009
20th-century women MEPs for the Republic of Ireland
21st-century women MEPs for the Republic of Ireland
Members of the 19th Seanad
Members of the 21st Seanad
20th-century women members of Seanad Éireann
21st-century women members of Seanad Éireann
Members of the 24th Dáil
Members of the 25th Dáil
Members of the 27th Dáil
20th-century women Teachtaí Dála
Ministers of State of the 24th Dáil
Ministers of State of the 27th Dáil
Politicians from County Dublin
Women ministers of state of the Republic of Ireland
Belton family
People educated at Holy Child Killiney